Temnothorax sentosus is a species of ant in the genus Temnothorax, that is native to Kazakhstan.

First described as Leonomyrma spinosa by Arnol'di (1968), and then moved to Chalepoxenus (as Chalepoxenus spinosus), the species became a secondary junior homonym and given the replacement name Temnothorax sentosus when Chalepoxenus was synonymized with Temnothorax by Ward et al. (2015).

References

External links

Myrmicinae
Insects of Central Asia
Hymenoptera of Asia
Endemic fauna of Kazakhstan
Insects described in 2015
Taxonomy articles created by Polbot
Taxobox binomials not recognized by IUCN